Paige Palmer (January 17, 1916 - November 21, 2009) was a pioneer American fitness and exercise expert, author, columnist, writer, model, television personality, and entrepreneur.

Biography 
Palmer was born Dorothy C. Rohrer and raised in Akron, Ohio. She was the hostess of the first daily televised fitness-oriented television show in the United States. The Paige Palmer Show ran on WEWS-TV, Cleveland, Ohio from 1948 to 1973. She is sometimes referred to as the "First Lady Of Fitness". Palmer also designed exercise equipment and fashions for women.

Palmer wrote numerous travel guides, and was also the first person in the world to interview the Dalai Lama after he came out of Tibet. Palmer was honored by the United States Congress for her efforts in "improving the quality of life for American Women."  This honor was recorded in the Congressional Record.

Palmer was inducted into the Ohio Women's Hall of Fame in 2000.

References

External links
2008 interview and photos from her life

1916 births
2009 deaths
American exercise instructors
Writers from Akron, Ohio
Television in Cleveland
University of Akron alumni